Leptospira kirschneri is a Gram negative, obligate aerobe species of spirochete bacteria named for University of Otago bacteriologist Dr. Leopold Kirschner. It is a member of the genus Leptospira. The species is pathogenic and can cause leptospirosis, most commonly in pigs.

References

External links
NCBI Taxonomy
Type strain of Leptospira kirschneri at BacDive -  the Bacterial Diversity Metadatabase

kirschneri
Bacteria described in 1992